The 2019 Big South Conference men's soccer tournament, was the 30th edition of the tournament. It determined the Big South Conference's automatic berth to the 2019 NCAA Division I men's soccer tournament.

Campbell won the tournament, making it their second consecutive and sixth all-time Big South championship. They defeated High Point in the final. With the title, Campbell earned their second consecutive automatic berth to the NCAA Tournament. They defeated James Madison in the first round 3–1, but fell to #1 Virginia in the second round 0–2.

Seeds

Bracket

Results

Quarterfinals

Semifinals

Final

All Tournament Team

References

External links 
 Big South Men's Soccer Tournament

2019
Tournament
2019 in sports in South Carolina